Al Checco (July 21, 1921 – July 19, 2015) was an American film, television and theatre actor. Born in Pittsburgh, Pennsylvania, he was known for playing the role of "Bernard Stein" in the 1968 film The Party. Checco was also the partner of actor, Don Knotts, in which they were performing entertainers in Special Services to soldiers during World War II. He died in July 2015 of natural causes at his home in Studio City, California, at the age of 93.

Selected filmography 
 The Incredible Mr. Limpet (1964) - Sailor (uncredited)
 The Ghost and Mr. Chicken (1966) - Gaylord Patie (uncredited)
 Hotel (1967) - Herbie Chandler
 The Reluctant Astronaut (1967) - Man at Console (uncredited)
 P.J. (1968) - Cab Driver (uncredited)
 The Party (1968) - Bernard Stein
 Bullitt (1968) - Desk Clerk
 Angel in My Pocket (1969) - Byron
 There Was a Crooked Man... (1970) - Wheatley (uncredited)
 Adam at 6 A.M. (1970) - (uncredited)
 I Love My Wife (1970) - Dr. Meyerberg
 How to Frame a Figg (1971) - (scenes deleted)
 Skin Game (1971) - Room Clerk
 Glass Houses (1972) - Man Wearing Black Cravat at Civic Meeting
 Get to Know Your Rabbit (1972) - Taxi Driver (uncredited)
 The World's Greatest Athlete (1973) - Dr. Checco
 Extreme Close-Up (1973) - Surveillance Salesman
 The Terminal Man (1974) - Farley
 Alex & the Gypsy (1976) - Nat
 Pete's Dragon (1977) - Fisherman #1
 Zero to Sixty (1978) - The Cook
 How to Beat the High Cost of Living (1980) - Tim Lundy

References

External links 

Rotten Tomatoes profile

1921 births
2015 deaths
People from Pittsburgh
Male actors from Pennsylvania
American male film actors
American male stage actors
American male television actors
20th-century American male actors